Iqbal Zuberi was a senior Pakistani journalist and a former chief editor and chief executive of the Daily Mashriq. Iqbal Zuberi was born in Bhopal in 1932.

Career 
He began his journalistic career in 1951 with the Tameer daily in Rawalpindi. His last assignment was that of resident editor with the Business Recorder when it began publication its Lahore edition.

Iqbal Zuberi, who was author of two books on journalism, was vice president of the Council of Pakistan Newspaper Editors and member of the standing committee of All Pakistan Newspapers Society.

Death 
Iqbal Zuberi died in Karachi on Tuesday 3 September 2002 after protracted illness. He was 70.

References 

Pakistani male journalists
Journalists from Lahore
Writers from Bhopal
Muhajir people
1932 births
2002 deaths